The International Card Manufacturers Association (ICMA) is a non-profit organization which represents companies and other organizations which manufacture, personalize and supply plastic cards. It is based in Princeton Junction, New Jersey.

The ICMA's stated mission is to promote the transaction card industry, along with the value of its products and services, by providing an independent forum to share knowledge and ideas.

ICMA is a member of both the American National Standards Institute (ANSI) and the International Organization for Standardization (ISO).

External links
 International Card Manufacturers Association

Card manufacturers